Acción Popular may refer to:

 Popular Action (El Salvador), a political party in El Salvador
 Popular Action (Peru), a centrist and social liberal party
 Popular Action (Spain), Spanish Roman Catholic political party from 1931 to 1937